Palmácia is located in the mountainous region of Ceará and stands out as a tourist destination in the state, classified as ideal city for eco-tourism and adventure tourism.

Images

See also
List of municipalities in Ceará

References

Municipalities in Ceará